Por Fin Solos (English: Finally Alone) is a Chilean mini-series produced, and being broadcast, by TVN.

Elisa Zulueta, Benjamín Vicuña, Gabriel Cañas, Luciana Echeverría, Daniel Muñoz and Francisca Gavilán star as the main protagonists.

History 
Por Fin Solos tell the story of Catalina and Gonzalo, a young couple who live in Santiago. They have a single child. The other couples in the story are Franco and Natalia, and Roberto and Cecilia.

Cast 
Francisca Gavilán as Cecilia
Daniel Muñoz as Roberto
Luciana Echeverría as Natalia Sierra
Elisa Zulueta as Catalina Carranza
Benjamín Vicuña as Gonzalo Muñoz
Gabriel Cañas as Franco Farías

External links 
 

Chilean telenovelas
Romance television series
2016 Chilean television series debuts
Spanish-language television shows
Televisión Nacional de Chile original programming